Frederick Burgess (October 6, 1853 – October 15, 1925) was bishop of the Episcopal Diocese of Long Island from 1901 to 1925.

Biography
Burgess was born October 6, 1853, in Providence, Rhode Island. He was the nephew of George Burgess, Bishop of Maine and Alexander Burgess, Bishop of Quincy. He graduated from Brown University in 1873, after which he studied at the General Theological Seminary in New York and then for one year at Oxford University in England. In 1898 Brown University granted him the Doctor of Divinity. He was ordained deacon in 1876 by Bishop William Woodruff Niles in Grace Church, Providence, Rhode Island, and priest in 1878 by Thomas M. Clark. Amongst the different parishes he served in Connecticut, Pennsylvania and Detroit, he was rector of Grace Church in Brooklyn, New York from 1898 till 1901. He was elected Bishop of Long Island in 1901 and was consecrated on January 15, 1902, by the Bishop of New York, Henry C. Potter. He retained the bishopric till his death. He was described as a High-churchman and a conservative.

External links 
New York Times account of funeral

1853 births
1924 deaths
Clergy from Providence, Rhode Island
Brown University alumni
General Theological Seminary alumni
Alumni of the University of Oxford
Episcopal bishops of Long Island